Fiske Terrace is a planned community and neighborhood in the New York City borough of Brooklyn. Fiske Terrace is located in south central Brooklyn in the southern edge of the community of Flatbush and north of the community of Midwood. It is bounded by Glenwood Road on the north, Ocean Avenue on the east, the Bay Ridge Branch of the Long Island Rail Road/New York and Atlantic Railway right-of-way on the south, and the New York City Subway BMT Brighton Line subway line on the west.

Overview 
Fiske Terrace was developed, along with Midwood Park with individually designed housing by the T.B. Ackerson Company in 1905; after the T. B. Ackerson Company bought what was then a forest, it was razed within 18 months, giving way to about 150 custom-made houses as well as streets and utilities, and the Midwood Malls. Prominent past residents included Richard Hellmann, creator and founder of "Hellmann's Mayonnaise", and Charles Ebbets, owner of Ebbets Field Baseball Stadium and the Brooklyn Dodgers. On March 18, 2008, the New York City Landmarks Preservation Commission unanimously approved designation of the Fiske Terrace-Midwood Park Historic District. 250 homes were designated.

The community is served by the Avenue H (formerly Fiske Terrace) station of the BMT Brighton Line, whose century-old station house was declared a landmark by the New York City Landmarks Preservation Commission on June 29, 2004. This allows renovations inside, but preserves the major structure and exterior. The contract to "restore the landmark station control house" as well as rehabilitation of the platforms and other stations structures was advertised for bids by the MTA for January 2007. The official designation report describes the building:

References 

Neighborhoods in Brooklyn
Planned communities in the United States
Flatbush, Brooklyn